Bartków may refer to:

Bartków, Góra County in Lower Silesian Voivodeship (south-west Poland)
Bartków, Oleśnica County in Lower Silesian Voivodeship (south-west Poland)
Bartków, Świętokrzyskie Voivodeship (south-central Poland)
Bartków, Masovian Voivodeship (east-central Poland)
Stary Bartków
Nowy Bartków

See also
Bartkowo